Tidal circularization is an effect of the tidal forces between an orbiting body and the primary object that it orbits, whereby the eccentricity of the orbit is reduced over time so that the orbit becomes less and less elliptical.  

In figure 1 let's start by assuming body 1 is a star and body 2 is another star or maybe a Jupiter like planet.  Initially think of body2 as a point mass. The gravity from Body 2 applied to Body 1 produces tidal bulges (see Tidal Force).  Let's assume the orbital period is slower than the rotation of Body 1 (ω<Ω) as shown in figure 1. One might expect a lag angle as shown.  If Body1 is 100% elastic (e.g. gas bodies are usually very elastic but a bag of sand is not very elastic) then the bulge wouldn't have a lag angle. The more inelastic, the larger the lag angle.  The larger the difference in angular velocities (ω/Ω), the larger the lag angle.  If ω>Ω, the lag angle will be in the other direction.

For a star we can think of inelasticity as viscosity.  The main cause of inelasticity in a star seems to be convection forces inside the star.
When the lag angle is non zero as in figure 1 you can see that the forces F1 and F2 combine to torque body 1 clockwise because F1 is stronger.  At the same time they torque the orbital motion counter clockwise: if you ignore the portion of F1 and F2 that lie along the line connecting the two bodies the remaining combined force on the entirety of body 1 is F3.  Similarly F1’ and F2’ combine to produce F3’.  F3 and F3’ torque the orbit counter clockwise.  Side note: rotational momentum of the combined rotations is preserved.

We now have a rule of thumb: Whenever angular velocity at a given moment of the orbit is less than the angular velocity of either body (ω<Ω) then the orbital torque tries to speed up the orbit.  And vice versa.

Now imagine two stars orbiting each other in elliptical orbits with the special case where both are tidally locked such that over the course of an orbit the same sides face each other (ω=Ω on average).  Although Ω is constant for one orbit, ω varies throughout the orbit.  Figure 2 shows the path of one of the stars where G is the center of gravity of the system.  When the objects are near apoapsis (red region of figure 2), ω<Ω which tries to speed up the orbit.  The result of this torque makes the far side of the orbit (periapsis) farther out making the orbit more circular.  This follows from the rule of thumb “if thrust is applied briefly to speed up an orbit (i.e. applied along the direction of travel), then when the object orbits half way around, that part of the orbit will be higher” and vice versa: “retrograde thrust lowers the far side of an orbit” (see orbital rules of thumb).

More importantly when Body 1 is in the green region of figure 2 and especially when it is closest to the center of gravity and therefore the tidal bulge is largest and ω/Ω is at maximum, the torque slows down the orbit (F3 in figure 1 is now negative because the lag angle is reversed) which lowers the far side of the orbit (lowers apoapsis).  Lowering Apsis or raising Periapsis is basically the definition of circularizing an orbit.

More complex situations

The objects in orbit don't have to be two stars.  One can be a planet or one can be a planet and one can be a moon.  Circularization can also occur in clusters of stars orbiting an imaginary point in space at the center of gravity.

Orbital circularization can be caused by either or both of the two objects in an orbit if either or both are inelastic.  Cooler stars tend to be more viscous and circularize objects orbiting them faster than hot stars.

If Ω/ω > 18/11 (~1.64) circularization won't occur and actually the eccentricity will increase.
So the bodies need to reach tidal lock first where at least one object has the same side facing the other object during the course of an orbit.  Tidal locking is another behavior caused by tidal forces.

See also
Tidal locking
Tidal acceleration

References

Tides
Orbits